The Dalatiidae are the family of kitefin sharks of the order Squaliformes (the term "kitefin shark" also refers specifically to the species Dalatias licha).
They have cigar-shaped bodies with narrow heads and rounded snouts. Several species have specialized bioluminescent organs. Though eight genera are in this family, four of them are monotypic.

Genera and species
 Dalatias Rafinesque, 1810
 Dalatias licha (Bonnaterre, 1788) (kitefin shark)
 †Dalatias orientalis (Malyshkina et al., 2022)
 Euprotomicroides Hulley and M. J. Penrith, 1966
 Euprotomicroides zantedeschia Hulley and M. J. Penrith, 1966 (tail-light shark)
 Euprotomicrus T. N. Gill, 1865
 Euprotomicrus bispinatus (Quoy & Gaimard, 1824) (pygmy shark)
 Heteroscymnoides Fowler, 1934
 Heteroscymnoides marleyi Fowler, 1934 (longnose pygmy shark)
 Isistius T. N. Gill, 1865
Isistius brasiliensis (Quoy & Gaimard, 1824) (cookiecutter shark)
Isistius plutodus Garrick & S. Springer, 1964 (largetooth cookiecutter shark)
 Mollisquama Dolganov, 1984
 Mollisquama parini Dolganov, 1984 (pocket shark)
 Mollisquama mississippiensis  (American pocket shark)
 Squaliolus H. M. Smith  and Radcliffe, 1912
 Squaliolus aliae Teng, 1959 (smalleye pygmy shark)
 Squaliolus laticaudus H. M. Smith  and Radcliffe, 1912 (spined pygmy shark)
 †Eosqualiolus Adnet, 2006
 †Eosqualiolus aturensis Adnet, 2006
 †Eosqualiolus skrovinai Underwood & Schlogl, 2012

See also

List of fish families
Deep sea fish

References

External links
 Dalatiidae in Fishesofaustralia.net.au 

 
Shark families
Taxa named by John Edward Gray